Xantonneopsis is a genus of plants in the family Rubiaceae. It contains only one known species, Xantonneopsis robinsonii, indigenous to Vietnam.

References

Monotypic Rubiaceae genera
Rubiaceae